Dušan Lazarević is a London-based television and film director.

Biography
Born in Belgrade, Serbia (Yugoslavia) Dušan started making short films while in high school. He came to the UK to attend the London Film School. War and the destruction of Yugoslavia compelled him to stay and build a career in the UK.

His graduation film, The Hottest Day of The Year, was a British entry at the AMPAS Student Academy Awards.

In 2019, he was nominated for a Daytime Emmy Award for Outstanding Directing For A Children's Series for Free Rein.

Amongst his recent work is Besa (TV series), a psychological crime thriller, created by British television writer Tony Jordan, set in the world of the Albanian mafia in the Balkans.

Filmography 
The Hottest Day of the Year (1991) Film
How to Kill (1992) TV Film
Living with Lionel (2000) Animated TV series
Hollyoaks (2003) TV series
Hollyoaks: Let Loose (2005) TV series
Grange Hill (2006) TV series
Žene sa Dedinja (2011) TV series
Misfits (TV series) (2012)
Vera (TV series) (2013) 
Death in Paradise (TV series) (2014)
Silent Witness (2014) TV series
Free Rein (2018) TV series
The Outpost (TV series) (2019)
Besa (TV series) (2019)

References

External links

Dušan-Lazarević Profile at The Artists Partnership
Personal website

Year of birth missing (living people)
British film directors
Serbian film directors
Television people from Belgrade
Living people
Yugoslav emigrants to the United Kingdom